Alfred Arthur Eric Ackerman (5 January 1929 – 10 July 1988) was a South African professional footballer. Born in Pretoria, Ackerman spent the majority of his career in Scotland and England, playing with Clyde, Hull City, Norwich City, Derby County, Carlisle United and Millwall. He was selected to play for the Third Division North side against the South in April 1957. After retiring as a player in 1961, Ackerman became player-manager of Dartford, and later manager of Gravesend & Northfleet. He died in Dunottan at the age of 59.

Ackerman finished as the top goal scorer in the Transvaal League in South Africa for two seasons in-a-row before signing for Clyde.

He was one of three South African footballers to play for Hull City in the 1950s, the others being Norman Nielson and Neil Cubie.

He scored 37 goals for Carlisle United in season 1957–58.

Career statistics

Honours 
 Derby County

 Division Three South runners-up: 1956–57

 Dartford

 Southern Division One promotion: 1962–63

 Northfleet

 Southern Division One promotion: 1970–71

 Individual
 Division Three South Top Scorer: 1957–58

References

External links
Player profile at Post War English & Scottish Football League A – Z Player's Database

1929 births
1988 deaths
South African soccer players
South African expatriate soccer players
South African soccer managers
Clyde F.C. players
Hull City A.F.C. players
Norwich City F.C. players
Derby County F.C. players
Carlisle United F.C. players
Millwall F.C. players
Dartford F.C. players
Scottish Football League players
English Football League players
Expatriate footballers in Scotland
Expatriate footballers in England
Soccer players from Pretoria
South African expatriate sportspeople in England
South African expatriate sportspeople in Scotland
Association football forwards
Dartford F.C. managers
Ebbsfleet United F.C. managers